The Mint Act 1817 (67 George III, c 57)  was an Act of the Parliament of the United Kingdom which changed the organisational structure of the mints  in England and Scotland which today make up the Royal Mint. The act's full title was "An Act to regulate certain offices in, and abolish others in his majesty's mints in England and Scotland respectively."

The act stipulated that after the termination of the last Warden of the Mint in England (Sir Walter James, 1st Baronet) and the last Governor of the Mint in Scotland, both offices would be abolished with the Warden's duties becoming those of Master and Worker and Scottish mint responsibilities held by the English Master of the Mint.

References 

United Kingdom Acts of Parliament 1817